The De Lattre Line, named after General Jean de Lattre de Tassigny, was a line of concrete fortifications, obstacles, and weapons installations constructed by the French around the Red River Delta in northern Vietnam.

The French established the fortification to guard the essential lines of communication between the cities of Hanoi and Haiphong and to provide security for the densely populated and economically important Delta area against attacks by both the Việt Minh and any potential invasion from Communist China.

Each blockhouse was to hold a minimum of 10 men. In addition a defensive redoubt was to be constructed around a   radius from the port of Haiphong ensuring its safety from artillery attack. All these new defensive lines were to be connected by roads capable of bearing 30-ton tanks. Construction commenced in late 1950 and was largely complete by the end of 1951.

While the De Lattre Line provided some degree of security and formed an anchor point for French mobile operations outside the Delta, it was far from impenetrable and entire Việt Minh combat units could be easily infiltrated through the gaps between strongpoints.

Following the withdrawal of the French from northern Vietnam in October 1954 the De Lattre Line was abandoned. Today the deteriorating blockhouses are either unused or used by farmers.

See also 
 Maginot Line
 McNamara Line

References 

Fortifications in Vietnam